Masyn Blaze Winn (born March 21, 2002) is an American professional baseball shortstop in the St. Louis Cardinals organization.

Amateur career
Winn was born in Katy, Texas, and grew up in Kingwood, Texas, where he attended Kingwood High School. After his freshman year, was named to USA Baseball's under-15 National Team and played in the COPABE Pan American AA Championships, where he batted .522 and was named the tournament MVP. As a junior in 2019, Winn had a 13–0 record on the mound with a 0.67 ERA and 117 strikeouts over  innings pitched while also hitting .417 with eight home runs and 46 RBIs, earning the title of District 22-6A MVP. Winn was suspended for the first 12 games of his senior year in 2020 due to an infraction of team rules and played in only one game before the season was cancelled due to the COVID-19 pandemic.

Professional career
The St. Louis Cardinals selected Winn in the second round of the 2020 Major League Baseball draft. He signed with the team for a $2.1 million bonus as a two-way player. Winn was named the best overall athlete in the Cardinals' minor league system going into the 2021 season. To begin the 2021 season, he was assigned to the Palm Beach Cardinals of the Low-A Southeast, where he began his professional career as a shortstop. After slashing .262/.370/.388 with three home runs, 34 RBIs, 15 doubles, three triples, and 16 stolen bases over 61 games, he was promoted to the Peoria Chiefs of the High-A Central in late July. Over 36 games with Peoria, he hit .209/.240/.304 with two home runs, ten RBIs, and 16 stolen bases. He pitched a total of one inning for the 2021 season. 

Winn returned to Peoria begin the 2022 season. After hitting .349/.404/.566 with one home run, 15 RBIs, and 15 stolen bases over 33 games, he was promoted to the Springfield Cardinals of the Double-A Texas League. He was selected to represent the Cardinals alongside Jordan Walker at the 2022 All-Star Futures Game. Over 86 games with Springfield to end the season, he slashed .258/.349/.432 with 11 home runs, 48 RBIs, 25 doubles, and 28 stolen bases. His season totals over 119 games between both teams included a .283 batting average, 12 home runs, 63 RBIs, 36 doubles, and 43 stolen bases. He was selected to play in the Arizona Fall League for the Salt River Rafters after the season.

References

External links

2002 births
Living people
Baseball players from Texas
People from Katy, Texas
Baseball shortstops
United States national baseball team players
Palm Beach Cardinals players
Peoria Chiefs players
Springfield Cardinals players